Akua is an Akan female  given name among the Akan people (i.e. Ashanti, Akuapem, Akyem, Fante) in Ghana that means "born on a Wednesday" in Akan language, following their day naming system. People born on particular days are supposed to exhibit the characteristics or attributes and philosophy, associated with the days. Akua has the appellation ''Obirisuo'', ''Obisi'' or ''Odaakuo''  meaning evil.

Origin and meaning 
In the Akan culture, day names are known to be derived from deities. Akua originated from Wukuada and from the Lord of Life’s Sky (heavenly) Host Day deity for Wednesday. Females born on Wednesday are champions of the cause of others but can be mean-spirited and tenacious (obrisii, "dark hearted"). The name is also associated with a spider (Ananse).

Female variant 
Day names in Ghana have varying spellings. This is so because of the various Akan subgroups. Each Akan subgroup has a similar or different spelling for the day name to other Akan subgroups. Akua is spelt Akua by the Akuapem and Ashanti subgroups while the Fante subgroup spell it as Ekua or Kuukua.

Male version 
In the Akan culture and other local cultures in Ghana, day names come in pairs for males and females. The variant of the name used for a male child born on Wednesday is Kwaku.

Notable people named Akua 
 Akua Sakyiwaa Ahenkorah, Ghanaian diplomat
 Akua Anokyewaa (born 1984), Ghanaian footballer
 Akua Asabea Ayisi (1927–2010), Ghanaian High Court Judge, journalist and feminist
 Akua Sena Dansua (born 1958), Ghanaian media and communications consultant, politician and governance and leadership practitioner
 Akua Donkor (born 1952), Ghanaian politician and the founder and leader of the Ghana Freedom Party
 Akua Lezli Hope, African-American artist, poet and writer
 Akua Kuenyehia (born 1947), Ghanaian lawyer
 Akua Naru, hip hop MC/rapper
 Akua Njeri, American writer and activist
 Akua Obeng-Akrofi (born 1996), Ghanaian sprinter
 Akua Shōma (born 1990), Japanese professional sumo wrestler
 Hilda Akua (born 1991), Ghanaian model and beauty pageant titleholder
 Ranin Akua, member of the Parliament of Nauru
 Riddell Akua (born 1963), politician from the Pacific nation of the Republic of Nauru
 Thrixeena Akua (born 1994), Nauruan sprinter

References 

Akan given names
African feminine given names